Patrick Chrestien Gordon Walker, Baron Gordon-Walker,  (7 April 1907 – 2 December 1980) was a British Labour Party politician. He was a Member of Parliament for nearly 30 years, and served twice as a Cabinet Minister. He lost his Smethwick parliamentary seat at the 1964 general election, in a bitterly racial campaign conducted in the wake of local factory closures.

Early life
Born in Worthing, Sussex, Gordon Walker was the son of Alan Lachlan Gordon Walker, a Scottish judge in the Indian Civil Service. He was educated at Wellington College and at Christ Church, Oxford, where he took a Second in Modern History in 1928 and subsequently gained a B. Litt. He served as a Student (Fellow) in history at Christ Church from 1931 until 1941.

From 1940 to 1944, Gordon Walker worked for the BBC's European Service, where from 1942 he arranged the BBC's daily broadcasts to Germany. In 1945, he worked as Assistant Director of BBC's German Service working from Radio Luxembourg, travelling with the British forces. He broadcast about the liberation of the German concentration camp at Bergen-Belsen, and wrote a book on the subject called The Lid Lifts.

From 1946 to 1948, he was Chairman of the British Film Institute.

Political career
He first stood for Parliament at the 1935 general election, when he was unsuccessful in the Conservative-held Oxford constituency.

In 1938, he was selected to stand again in the Oxford by-election. The Liberal Party had selected Ivor Davies, who offered to stand down from the by-election if Labour did the same and backed a Popular Front candidate against the Conservatives. Eventually, Gordon Walker reluctantly stood down and both parties supported Sandy Lindsay as an Independent Progressive. Quintin Hogg, the Conservative candidate, defeated Lindsay in the by-election.

Gordon Walker did not contest the 1945 general election, but was elected later in 1945 as Member of Parliament (MP) for Smethwick in a by-election on 1 October 1945 after Labour's Alfred Dobbs was killed in a car accident one day after winning the seat at the 1945 general election. After the by-election, Gordon Walker's support in the constituency gradually declined.

Once in Parliament, Gordon Walker was promoted rapidly through the ranks of Clement Attlee's Labour government. In 1946, he was appointed as Parliamentary Private Secretary (PPS) to Herbert Morrison, the Leader of the House of Commons. From 1947 to 1950, he was a Parliamentary Under-Secretary of State at the Commonwealth Relations Office, and in 1950 he joined the Cabinet as Secretary of State for Commonwealth Relations, serving until Labour's defeat at the 1951 general election.

As Commonwealth Secretary in 1950, Gordon Walker persuaded the cabinet to agree to prevent Seretse Khama, the heir to the throne of the British protectorate of Bechuanaland, from becoming its king – on the grounds that he had wed a white English woman, Ruth Williams, an inter-racial marriage that had upset Bechuanaland's neighbouring state, apartheid South Africa.

Khama had been brought to Britain by the government under false pretences, ostensibly to talk about his future, and at Gordon Walker's behest he was then prevented from returning to his homeland for five years, subsequently increased to a lifetime ban (although eventually rescinded by a later, Conservative, government). Khama said the unexpected and earth shattering news of his exile was given to him by Gordon Walker in an 'unemotional' and 'unfeeling' manner. 'I doubt that any man has been asked to give up his birthright in such cold, calculating terms,' he said.

After the 1964 general election, following a successful career in opposition, Gordon Walker became Foreign Secretary in the Labour government; he had held the shadow role for the previous year.

Although Labour did win that election to end 13 years of Conservative rule, Gordon Walker was defeated in controversial circumstances by the Conservative candidate Peter Griffiths. Smethwick had been a focus of immigration from the Commonwealth but the economic and industrial growth of the years following the Second World War were coupled with local factory closures, an ageing population and a lack of modern housing. Griffiths ran a campaign critical of the opposition's, and the government's, policies, including immigration policies. Griffiths was also accused of exploiting the slogan "If you want a nigger neighbour, vote Labour".

Despite, therefore, not being an MP or peer able to answer to Parliament, Gordon Walker was appointed to the Foreign Office by Harold Wilson. To resolve this unusual situation, he stood for the safe Labour constituency of Leyton in the Leyton by-election in January 1965, losing again, and was finally forced to resign as Foreign Secretary. After a sabbatical conducting research in Southeast Asia, he finally won Leyton in the 1966 general election. Following this election, he served in the Cabinet in 1967–68, first as Minister without Portfolio, then as Secretary of State for Education and Science. On his retirement from the Cabinet in 1968, he was made a Companion of Honour.

Gordon Walker retired from the House of Commons at the February 1974 general election. On 4 July that same year he was made a life peer as Baron Gordon-Walker, of Leyton in Greater London, in 1974 and was briefly a Member of the European Parliament.

Personal life
In 1934 he married Audrey Muriel Rudolf. They subsequently had twin sons and three daughters. Lord Gordon-Walker died in London in 1980, aged 73.

References

Publications by Patrick Gordon Walker

Sources

Pearce, R. (2004) "Gordon Walker, Patrick Chrestien, Baron Gordon-Walker (1907–1980)", Oxford Dictionary of National Biography, Oxford University Press, accessed 26 August 2007

External links

The Papers of Baron Gordon-Walker held at Churchill Archives Centre
BBC Recording of Gordon-Walker reporting from newly liberated Bergen Belsen

|-

|-

|-

|-

|-

|-

|-

1907 births
1980 deaths
British Secretaries of State for Education
British Secretaries of State for Foreign Affairs
Labour Party (UK) life peers
Labour Party (UK) MEPs
Labour Party (UK) MPs for English constituencies
Members of the Fabian Society
Members of the Order of the Companions of Honour
Members of the Privy Council of the United Kingdom
MEPs for the United Kingdom 1973–1979
People educated at Wellington College, Berkshire
People from Worthing
UK MPs 1945–1950
UK MPs 1950–1951
UK MPs 1951–1955
UK MPs 1955–1959
UK MPs 1959–1964
UK MPs 1966–1970
UK MPs 1970–1974
UK MPs who were granted peerages
Ministers in the Attlee governments, 1945–1951
Ministers in the Wilson governments, 1964–1970
Life peers created by Elizabeth II